The George K. Crozer Mansion, also known as Netherleigh, was an historic mansion which was located in Upland, Delaware County, Pennsylvania.

It was added to the National Register of Historic Places in 1973.

History and architectural features
Built by George K. Crozer, the son of John Price Crozer, who founded a milling business on nearby Chester Creek, as well as the modern borough of Upland, this Italianate-style mansion, was erected in 1869. Destroyed by fire in June 1990, it was subsequently demolished.

The mansion was added to the National Register of Historic Places in 1973.

References

External links
The Uplander, Spring 2011 - contains an illustration of the mansion.

Houses on the National Register of Historic Places in Pennsylvania
Italianate architecture in Pennsylvania
Houses completed in 1869
Houses in Delaware County, Pennsylvania
1869 establishments in Pennsylvania
National Register of Historic Places in Delaware County, Pennsylvania
Demolished buildings and structures in Pennsylvania